is a volleyball player from Japan.

She competed at the 2004 and  2008 Olympic Games for the Japanese team, finishing fifth on both occasions.

References

External links
FIVB biography

Volleyball players at the 2008 Summer Olympics
1976 births
Living people
Japanese women's volleyball players
Volleyball players at the 2004 Summer Olympics
Olympic volleyball players of Japan
Sportspeople from Kyoto